Bijpur AB High School also known as Bijpur Atal Bihari High School is a co-ed secondary school.

History
The school was incorporated in the year 1951. Bijpur AB High School has been accredited by West Bengal Board of Secondary Education. It has recently been upgraded to the status of higher secondary school. It is financed by the Self Financing Bankura, West Bengal.

See also
Education in India
List of schools in India
Education in West Bengal

References

External links 

1951 establishments in West Bengal
Educational institutions established in 1951
High schools and secondary schools in West Bengal
Schools in Bankura district